Lu Tien-lin (born 9 November 1959) is a Taiwanese politician. He was the Minister of Council of Labor Affairs in 2007-2008.

Education
Lu obtained his master's degree in engineering science from National Taiwan Ocean University.

Political career
Lu was appointed as the Minister of Council of Labor Affairs on 16 May 2017 by Premier-designated Chang Chun-hsiung after Premier Su Tseng-chang and his cabinet tendered their resignation.

References

1959 births
Living people
Taiwanese Ministers of Labor
Party List Members of the Legislative Yuan
Members of the 6th Legislative Yuan
Democratic Progressive Party Members of the Legislative Yuan
National Taiwan Ocean University alumni